In 2020 New Hampshire ranked sixth in terms of per capita income in the United States of America, at $41,234 as of the 2016-2020 American Community Survey 5-year estimate.

New Hampshire counties ranked by per capita income

Note: Data are from the 2020 United States census and the 2016-2020 American Community Survey 5-year estimates.

New Hampshire places ranked by per capita income

Data are from the 2016-2020 American Community Survey 5-year estimates.

See also

New Hampshire communities by household income
List of cities and towns in New Hampshire

References

United States locations by per capita income
Economy of New Hampshire
Income